Brandon White (born 13 January 1997) is a former Australian rules footballer who played for the St Kilda Football Club in the Australian Football League (AFL). 

He was drafted by St Kilda with their second selection and fortieth overall in the 2015 national draft. He was delisted at the conclusion of the 2019 AFL season.

References

External links

1997 births
Living people
St Kilda Football Club players
Dandenong Stingrays players
Sandringham Football Club players
Australian rules footballers from Victoria (Australia)